June Jago (31 March 1928 – 29 July 2010) was an Australian-born actress.

Biography
She made her stage debut in Australia and went to Britain in the 1950s with a touring production of Summer of the Seventeenth Doll. She made her film debut in 1959 in Please Turn Over, alongside Ted Ray, Jean Kent, Leslie Phillips and Joan Sims.

She appeared in two of the Carry On films - Carry On Regardless (1961) and Carry On Doctor (1967) -  and her other film credits included roles in The Captain's Table (1959), No Kidding (1960), Journey into Darkness (1968), The Games (1970) and Melody (1971). She appeared on television in programmes such as Catweazle and The Good Life.

On stage, she appeared with the Royal Shakespeare Company and the Royal Court Theatre. She also appeared in the Australian films The Man from Snowy River (1982), Double Deal (1983) and Departure (1986).

Jago returned to Australia in the late 1970s and continued to act, notably with the Melbourne Theatre Company, and also worked as a teacher of acting and elocution.

Filmography

References

External links

1928 births
2010 deaths
Australian film actresses
Australian stage actresses
Australian television actresses
British film actresses
British stage actresses
British television actresses
Australian emigrants to the United Kingdom